Valeriy Ihorovych Luchkevych (born 11 January 1996) is a Ukrainian professional footballer who plays as a midfielder for Dnipro-1.

Career
Luchkevych is a son of Ukrainian international player and current coach Ihor Luchkevych and product of FC Metalurh Zaporizhya youth sportive school system. In December 2013 he signed a contract with FC Dnipro Dnipropetrovsk. He made his debut for FC Dnipro in the match against FC Karpaty Lviv on 10 August 2014 in the Ukrainian Premier League.

On 30 January 2017, Luchkevych signed for Belgian club Standard Liège. On 12 March 2017, he made his debut for the club coming on as a substitute in a 55th minute in a Belgian First Division A match against Oostende. On 13 May 2017, he scored the first goal for his club in a Europa League play-off match of Belgian First Division A against Mechelen.

Career statistics

Club

Honors

Dnipro Dnipropetrovsk
UEFA Europa League runner-up: 2014–15

References

External links

1996 births
Footballers from Zaporizhzhia
Living people
Ukrainian footballers
Association football midfielders
Ukraine under-21 international footballers
Ukraine youth international footballers
FC Metalurh Zaporizhzhia players
FC Dnipro players
Standard Liège players
FC Oleksandriya players
SC Dnipro-1 players
Ukrainian Premier League players
Belgian Pro League players
Ukrainian expatriate footballers
Expatriate footballers in Belgium
Ukrainian expatriate sportspeople in Belgium